Stinky generally refers to having a strong odor. 

Stinky may also refer to:

People
 Stinky, female professional wrestler half of the tag-team Stinky and Sneaky from the Gorgeous Ladies of Wrestling
 Mr. Stinky, nickname of Raymond Edmunds, Australian convicted rapist and murderer
 Harry Davis (1908–1997), American professional baseball player

Fictional characters
 Stinky (Foster's Home for Imaginary Friends), on the American animated television show Foster's Home for Imaginary Friends
 Stinky, portrayed by comedian Joe Besser on the syndicated television sitcom The Abbott and Costello Show
 Stinky, a character from the Moomins series of comics and cartoons
 Stinky, one of Casper the Friendly Ghost's uncles, who are better known as The Ghostly Trio
 Stinky Davis, a character in the Toonerville Folks newspaper cartoon
 Stinky Pete (Toy Story 2), in the film Toy Story 2
 Stinky Pete, a seal in the television series Sealab 2021
 Stinky Peterson (disambiguation), characters in various television shows
 Stinky Smurf, a character in the cartoon The Smurfs

Other uses
 Stinky, slang term used by cavers, for a carbide lamp
 Stinky, Donetsk Oblast, a settlement in Ukraine

See also
 Stink (disambiguation)
 Stinker (disambiguation)
 Smelly (disambiguation)